Vermivore (from Latin vermi, meaning "worm" and vorare, "to devour") is a zoological term for animals that eat worms (including annelids, nematodes, and other worm-like animals). Animals with such a diet are known to be vermivorous. Some definitions are less exclusive with respect to the diet, but limit the definition to particular animals, e.g. "Feeding on worms or insect vermin. Used of a bird." 

An entire genus of New World warblers has been given the name Vermivora.

One vermivore that may feed exclusively on worms is Paucidentomys vermidax, a rodent species of a type commonly known as shrew rats which was discovered in 2011 in Indonesia.  The name, which can be translated as "worm-eating, few-toothed mouse", refers to the fact that they have only four teeth and may live exclusively on a diet of earthworms. This reduced dentition in vermivorous mammals is said to be due to relaxed selectional pressure on dental occlusion.

Examples
Shrews
Tuataras
Hedgehogs
Kiwi
Long-beaked echidna
Platypus
Woodcocks
Leeches of the genus Americobdella
Moles 
American robins
Wormsnakes
Some sea snails e.g. Jaspidiconus and Conus species.

See also
Carnivore
Frugivore
Herbivore
Insectivore
List of feeding behaviours
Nectarivore
Omnivore

References

Carnivory
Ethology
Animals by eating behaviors